is a former Japanese football player.

Suzuki previously played for Roasso Kumamoto in the J2 League.

Club statistics

References

External links

1982 births
Living people
Komazawa University alumni
Association football people from Saitama Prefecture
Japanese footballers
J2 League players
Japan Football League players
Roasso Kumamoto players
AC Nagano Parceiro players
FC Machida Zelvia players
Kamatamare Sanuki players
SC Sagamihara players
Association football defenders